First Finale (Japanese: ファースト・フィナーレ; stylized as FIRST FINALE) is the fifth and final studio album by Kiyotaka Sugiyama & Omega Tribe, released by VAP on December 11, 1985, shortly before their breakup on December 24. Then  album peaked at the #1 spot of the Oricon charts, and the album's single, "Glass No Palm Tree," peaked at #5.

Background 
At the end of 1985, the group decided to have a "developmental dissolution." The best album Single's History was scheduled to be the last album, but at the suggestion of Tetsuji Hayashi, it was decided that they would make another album. The title was also given by Hayashi. In addition, Yasushi Akimoto, who has provided many lyrics since the debut in the lyrics, did not participate in this work, while producer Koichi Fujita did. Also, in the arrangement, Masanori Sasaji, who will later work on Sugiyama's solo work, also participated.

During the group's last tour of the same name from October 4 to December 24, no song from this album was played. After that, "Glass No Palm Tree" and "First Finale" were played at the 2004 reunion tour "First Finale 2". Also, "Kimi wa In The Rain" has been featured many times in Sugiyama's solo performances.

Like with their previous album, Another Summer, First Finale reached the #1 spot, recording the largest sales. It was also ranked 6th on the 1986 annual album chart.

Many best albums have been released since this work, and the best album The Omega Tribe, selected by the members, was released at the time of the reunion in 2004, but no new song under the name "Kiyotaka Sugiyama & Omega Tribe". From September 2016, it is available on MEG-CD.

The portrait of the back jacket is a photo selected from the photos solicited from the public.

Track listing

Personnel 

Bass – Takao Oshima 
Session Coordinator – Nicky Enterprises, Velvet Line 
Design – Rikaco Furuya, Takeharu Tanaka 
Directors – Ken Shiguma, Shigeru Matsuhashi 
Drums & Percussion – Keiichi Hiroshi 
Digital Editor – Kenji Takeda 
Overdubbing Engineers – Hiroshi Fujita, Jun Wakao, Tatsuo Sekine, Yoshiaki Matsuoka 
Second Engineers – Hiroshi Shitamiya, Junichi Fujimori, Kazuyoshi Inoue, Mizuo Miura, Toshio Misu, Yoshiyuki Kaneko 
Executive-Producer – Atsushi Kitamura, Katsuhiko Endo
Guitar – Shinji Takashima 
Keyboards – Toshitsugu Nishihara 
Lacquer Cut By – Osamu Shimoju 
Artist Management – Triangle Production 
Photography – Kohga Sekido (Front cover), Yukiya Negami (Back cover) 
Producer – Koichi Fujita 
Recorded By, Mixed By – Kunihiko "Jr." Shimizu 
Supervised By – Tetsuji Hayashi 
Vocals – Kiyotaka Sugiyama

Charts

References 

1985 albums
Omega Tribe (Japanese band) albums